Maryland House of Delegates District 1A is one of the 67 districts that compose the Maryland House of Delegates. Along with subdistricts 1B and 1C, it makes up the 1st district of the Maryland Senate. Situated on the state's western border, District 1A includes all of Garrett County, and a small portion of Allegany County. Since 2023, it has been represented by Jim Hinebaugh, a Republican.

Demographic characteristics
As of the 2020 United States census, the district had a population of 38,903, of whom 31,377 (80.7%) were of voting age. The racial makeup of the district was 37,120 (95.4%) White, 302 (0.8%) African American, 42 (0.1%) Native American, 155 (0.4%) Asian, 12 (0.0%) Pacific Islander, 157 (0.4%) from some other race, and 1,120 (2.9%) from two or more races. Hispanic or Latino of any race were 421 (1.1%) of the population.

The district had 27,037 registered voters as of October 17, 2020, of whom 3,693 (13.7%) were registered as unaffiliated, 17,456 (64.6%) were registered as Republicans, 5,534 (20.5%) were registered as Democrats, and 205 (0.8%) were registered to other parties.

Past Election Results

1982

1998

2002

2006

2010

2014

2018

List of delegates

References

1A